Jackson County Jail in Newport, Arkansas was built in 1905.  It was listed on the National Register of Historic Places in 1979.

It was delisted on September 20, 2006.

References

Jails on the National Register of Historic Places in Arkansas
Government buildings completed in 1905
Buildings and structures in Jackson County, Arkansas
National Register of Historic Places in Jackson County, Arkansas
1905 establishments in Arkansas
Newport, Arkansas